Bertus Hendrik Basson (born 12 April 1979) is a South African chef, restaurateur, entrepreneur and TV personality best known for his work as head chef of Overture in Stellenbosch, Western Cape.

Early life 
After being born in Cape Town in 1979, Bertus was brought up in Polokwane, Nelspruit and Witbank. He began to help his mother with cooking in the kitchen at a young age. Growing up, Basson also worked as a waiter at Spur Steak Ranches, as well as at a liquor store and a toy store.

Career 
Bertus Basson began working in the culinary career when he was 17 years old. He moved to London at the age of 19 to work at the Michelin starred restaurant Chez Bruce. Basson began his first catering business, All Things Culinary, in 2005. In 2007, Bertus was named Unilever Chef of the Year, before establishing his first restaurant, Overture in November. Overture has been awarded distinguished accolades from both the Eat Out Guide and Rossouws Restaurant Guide while under his leadership.

Basson appeared as a judge on Season 1, 2, 3 and 4 of the national cooking show The Ultimate Braai Master on SABC 3. He also appears as a guest on the lifestyle TV show Top Billing as well as the daily talk show Expresso.

Basson was crowned with "Chef of the Year" at the 2019 South African EatOut Awards for his work at Eike and Overture.

Restaurants

Books 
Bertus Basson has two books to his name:

 Homegrown (2017, Jacana Media)
 Being Bertus Basson (2018, Jacana Media)

Awards and nominations

References 

1979 births
Living people
South African chefs
South African cookbook writers
South African television personalities
People from the Western Cape
South African writers
People from Cape Town